The 2015 Monster Energy FIM Speedway World Cup (SWC) was the fifteenth FIM Speedway World Cup, the annual international speedway world championship tournament. It took place between 6 June and 14 June 2015 and involved nine national teams. It was won by Sweden, the first time they have achieved success since 2004. They beat hosts and defending champions Denmark by two points, while Poland edged out Australia to claim third.

Qualification

 Landshut - 9 May 2015

Qualified teams

Tournament

The final was delayed from 13 Jun until 14 Jun after rain caused the meeting to be abandoned.

Final classification

See also
 2015 Speedway Grand Prix

References

External links
 Official website 

 
World Team
2015